Immyrla is a genus of snout moths in the family Pyralidae. It was described by Harrison Gray Dyar Jr. in 1906. The genus contains only one species, Immyrla nigrovittella. Snout moths are a type of pyralid moth, which are in turn a type of lepidopteran, or butterfly and moth, in the order Lepidoptera. Like all insects, snout moths belong to the phylum Anthropoda and the kingdom Animalia.

Species
 Immyrla nigrovittella Dyar, 1906

References

Phycitinae